Rudolph Tomjanovich Jr. (born November 24, 1948) is an American former professional basketball player and coach who is a consultant for the Minnesota Timberwolves of the National Basketball Association (NBA). His professional playing career, which lasted between 1970 and 1981, was entirely spent with the San Diego / Houston Rockets. Tomjanovich was a 5-time NBA All-Star forward; four consecutive times between 1974 and 1977, and again in 1979. He also made the playoffs five times: in 1975, 1977, and consecutively between 1979 and 1981.

On December 9, 1977, during a game between the Rockets and the Los Angeles Lakers, Tomjanovich was the victim of a life-threatening punch to his face brought upon him by Lakers power forward Kermit Washington. This ended his season after 23 games; after fully recovering, Tomjanovich played in the NBA for three more seasons.

After about eight years of being an assistant coach, Tomjanovich was promoted to head coach of the Rockets from 1992 to 2003, including when the Rockets won two consecutive NBA championships in 1994 and 1995. Tomjanovich coached Team USA to the gold medal in men's basketball at the 2000 Summer Olympics. He also coached the Los Angeles Lakers during part of the 2004–05 NBA season. He was inducted into the Naismith Hall of Fame on May 16, 2021.

Early life
Tomjanovich was born in Hamtramck, Michigan, the son of Catherine (Modich) and Rudy Tomjanovich. He is of Croatian descent. He attended high school in Hamtramck and later the University of Michigan (1967–1970). He was a high school teammate of ABA player John Brisker.

Playing career

College career (1967–1970)

In college, Tomjanovich set Michigan Wolverines men's basketball career rebounding records that continue to stand. In 1968 he earned second team All-Big Ten honors, which he followed with first-team honors in 1969 and 1970.  During 1970 he was also an All-American.

San Diego / Houston Rockets (1970–1981)
Tomjanovich was selected in the 1970 NBA draft as the second overall pick by the San Diego Rockets (the franchise relocated to Houston in 1971), for whom he would play the entirety of his NBA career. He was also drafted in both 1970 and 1974 by the Utah Stars of the ABA. In his eleven years in the NBA, Tomjanovich had a scoring average of 17.4 points and a rebounding average of 8.1, earning five All-Star Game selections in the process (1974–1977, 1979).  He is the fourth-leading scorer in Rockets history behind James Harden and Hall of Famers Calvin Murphy and Hakeem Olajuwon. Because his last name was so long, the back of Tomjanovich's jerseys would read "RUDY T.", rather than his 11 character name.

The Rockets retired Tomjanovich's #45 jersey upon the conclusion of his playing career.  His collegiate jersey, also #45, was retired by the University of Michigan in 2003.

Kermit Washington incident
During a game on December 9, 1977, Tomjanovich was punched by Kermit Washington of the Los Angeles Lakers after Tomjanovich ran to stop a fight at center court. The blow shattered Tomjanovich's face and inflicted life-threatening head and spinal injuries, leaving him sidelined for five months. He eventually made a full recovery and was selected for the NBA All-Star Game the following 1978–79 season. The incident and its aftermath are recounted in the John Feinstein book The Punch: One Night, Two Lives, and the Fight That Changed Basketball Forever, as well as in Tomjanovich's 1997 autobiography A Rocket at Heart: My Life and My Team.

Coaching career

Coaching style
Tomjanovich was well known for his instinctive managerial style and intensity on the bench.  Always self-deprecating, he nonetheless heaped tremendous pressure on himself and his assistants to be prepared for each game, several times being hospitalized for exhaustion.  After winning back-to-back titles, Tomjanovich deflected much of the praise and eschewed the "genius" label assigned to other champion coaches like Chuck Daly and Phil Jackson.  His hands-off, easy-going manner with his players gave him a reputation as a "players coach", and as such veteran players were eager to play on his teams.  Among the stars who requested and were granted trades to Houston during his tenure were Clyde Drexler, Charles Barkley, and Scottie Pippen.

U.S. Men's national team
In 1998, Tomjanovich volunteered to coach the U.S. men's senior basketball team at the FIBA World Championship in Greece. Despite the absence of NBA players due to contract negotiations, Tomjanovich guided the hastily assembled group of CBA and college players to the bronze medal. In light of his outstanding service in coaching at the 1998 Worlds and his stellar professional resume, Tomjanovich was tabbed to coach the U.S. men's senior team at the Games of the XXVII Olympiad in Sydney, Australia. The U.S. Team won the gold medal with an 8–0 record. On February 15, 2006, Tomjanovich was named director of scouting for USA Men's Basketball.

NBA

Houston Rockets (1992–2003) 
Tomjanovich retired in 1981 and became a scout for two years before being named an assistant coach in 1983.  He served as an assistant under Bill Fitch and Don Chaney.

Tomjanovich was named the Rockets' interim head coach in February 1992 after Chaney's resignation.  After nearly leading the Rockets to a playoff berth, he was then given the job on a permanent basis.

In his first full season on the job (1992–93), Tomjanovich guided the Rockets to the Midwest Division title, making him the first head coach to ever take his team from the lottery to a division crown during his first full season.  Building on this success, Tomjanovich led the team to back-to-back NBA championships in 1994 and 1995; additionally, the Rockets were the only team other than the Chicago Bulls to win multiple championships during the 1990s, with their titles being bookended by the Bulls' two runs of three consecutive titles each. On the playoff run to their second title, the Rockets became the lowest seed (sixth) to win one, and the only team in history to defeat the teams with the four best regular-season records in the playoffs. It was on the floor of The Summit after they captured their second title that Tomjanovich proclaimed, "Don't ever underestimate the heart of a champion!" 

In his 11-plus season tenure as Rockets head coach, he posted a 503–397 (.559) regular-season record and a 51–39 (.567) playoff mark. His career wins and winning percentage are Rockets franchise records. After the 1998-99 season, the Rockets would not make the playoffs for the rest of his coaching tenure, and would consistently finish in the division cellar; Tomjanovich left the team after the 2002–03 season when he was diagnosed with bladder cancer (from which he has since made a full recovery), ending a 33-year association with the Rockets franchise—including its first 32 years in Houston—as a player, assistant coach and head coach.

Los Angeles Lakers (2004–2005) 
In 2004, Tomjanovich signed a five-year, $30 million contract to replace Phil Jackson as coach of the Los Angeles Lakers.  He resigned after 43 games, citing mental and physical exhaustion unrelated to his past bout with bladder cancer.  The Lakers paid him a $10 million settlement, leading to speculation that the Lakers had instead terminated his contract. Tomjanovich stayed with the Lakers as a consultant.

Personal life
In 1970, Tomjanovich married Sophie Migas, a former cheerleader. They have two daughters and one son. He currently resides in Austin, Texas.

Tomjanovich has participated with the Texas Children's Cancer Center to help raise funds for cancer research. He has also helped promote a deadbolt called the "Ultimate Lock" and CieAura health care products.

Accomplishments
NBA Champion head coach (1994, 1995)
Head coach of the gold medalist USA men's basketball team at the 2000 Summer Olympics
Head coach of the bronze medalist USA men's basketball team at the 1998 FIBA World Championship
5-time All-Star (1974–1977, 1979)
NCAA All-American (1970)
All-time University of Michigan leader in rebounds. Second on U-M all-time list in points per game
Holds the Crisler Arena single game scoring and rebounding records
Averaged 17.4 points per game on 50.1% shooting during his NBA career
Michigan Sports Hall of Fame
Houston Sports Hall of Fame
Naismith Memorial Basketball Hall of Fame

NBA career statistics

Regular season

|-
| style="text-align:left;"| 1970–71
| style="text-align:left;"| San Diego
| 77 || ... || 13.8 || .383 || ... || .652 || 4.9 || .9 || ... || ... || 5.3
|-
| style="text-align:left;"| 1971–72
| style="text-align:left;"| Houston
| 78 || ... || 34.5 || .495 || ... || .723 || 11.8 || 1.5 || ... || ... || 15.0
|-
| style="text-align:left;"| 1972–73
| style="text-align:left;"| Houston
| 81 || ... || 36.7 || .478 || ... || .746 || 11.6 || 2.2 || ... || ... || 19.3
|-
| style="text-align:left;"| 1973–74
| style="text-align:left;"| Houston
| 80 || ... || 40.3 || .536 || ... || .848 || 9.0 || 3.1 || 1.1 || .8 || 24.5
|-
| style="text-align:left;"| 1974–75
| style="text-align:left;"| Houston
| 81 || ... || 38.7 || .525 || ... || .790 || 7.6 || 2.9 || .9 || .3 || 20.7
|-
| style="text-align:left;"| 1975–76
| style="text-align:left;"| Houston
| 79 || ... || 36.9 || .517 || ... || .767 || 8.4 || 2.4 || .5 || .2 || 18.5
|-
| style="text-align:left;"| 1976–77
| style="text-align:left;"| Houston
| 81 || ... || 38.6 || .510 || ... || .839 || 8.4 || 2.1 || .7 || .3 || 21.6
|-
| style="text-align:left;"| 1977–78
| style="text-align:left;"| Houston
| 23 || ... || 36.9 || .485 || ... || .753 || 6.0 || 1.4 || .7 || .2 || 21.5
|-
| style="text-align:left;"| 1978–79
| style="text-align:left;"| Houston
| 74 || ... || 35.7 || .517 || ... || .760 || 7.7 || 1.9 || .6 || .2 || 19.0
|-
| style="text-align:left;"| 1979–80
| style="text-align:left;"| Houston
| 62 || ... || 29.6 || .476 || .278 || .803 || 5.8 || 1.8 || .5 || .2 || 14.2
|-
| style="text-align:left;"| 1980–81
| style="text-align:left;"| Houston
| 52 || ... || 24.3 || .467 || .235 || .793 || 4.0 || 1.6 || .4 || .1 || 11.6
|-
| style="text-align:center;" colspan=2|Career
| 768 || ... || 33.5 || .501 || .262 || .784 || 8.1 || 2.0 || .7 || .3 || 17.4

Playoffs

|-
| style="text-align:left;"| 1975
| style="text-align:left;"| Houston
| 8 || ... || 38.0 || .563 || ... || .833 || 8.0 || 2.9 || .1 || .5 || 23.0
|-
| style="text-align:left;"| 1977
| style="text-align:left;"| Houston
| 12 || ... || 38.1 || .505 || ... || .784 || 5.4 || 2.0 || .6 || .3 || 20.3
|-
| style="text-align:left;"| 1979
| style="text-align:left;"| Houston
| 2 || ... || 32.0 || .391 || ... || .400 || 7.0 || 1.0 || .5 || .5 || 10.0
|-
| style="text-align:left;"| 1980
| style="text-align:left;"| Houston
| 7 || ... || 26.4 || .375 || .143 || .692 || 5.7 || 1.4 || .3 || .0 || 8.3
|-
| style="text-align:left;"| 1981
| style="text-align:left;"| Houston
| 8 || ... || 3.9 || .111 || .000 || .667 || .8 || .0 || .0 || .0 || .8
|-
| style="text-align:center;" colspan=2|Career
| 37 || ... || 28.1 || .489 || .100 || .771 || 5.1 || 1.6 || .3 || .2 || 13.8
|-

Head coaching record

|-
| style="text-align:left;"|Houston
| style="text-align:left;"|
|30||16||14||.533|| style="text-align:center;"|3rd in Midwest||—||—||—||—
| style="text-align:center;"|Missed Playoffs
|-
| style="text-align:left;"|Houston
| style="text-align:left;"|
|82||55||27||.671|| style="text-align:center;"|1st in Midwest||12||6||6||.500
| style="text-align:center;"|Lost in Conf. Semifinals
|- ! style="background:#FDE910;"
| style="text-align:left;"|Houston
| style="text-align:left;"|
|82||58||24||.707|| style="text-align:center;"|1st in Midwest||23||15||8||.652
| style="text-align:center;"|Won NBA Championship
|- ! style="background:#FDE910;"
| style="text-align:left;"|Houston
| style="text-align:left;"|
|82||47||35||.573|| style="text-align:center;"|3rd in Midwest||22||15||7||.682
| style="text-align:center;"|Won NBA Championship
|-
| style="text-align:left;"|Houston
| style="text-align:left;"|
|82||48||34||.585|| style="text-align:center;"|3rd in Midwest||8||3||5||.375
| style="text-align:center;"|Lost in Conf. Semifinals
|-
| style="text-align:left;"|Houston
| style="text-align:left;"|
|82||57||25||.695|| style="text-align:center;"|2nd in Midwest||16||9||7||.563
| style="text-align:center;"|Lost in Conf. Finals
|-
| style="text-align:left;"|Houston
| style="text-align:left;"|
|82||41||41||.500|| style="text-align:center;"|4th in Midwest||5||2||3||.400
| style="text-align:center;"|Lost in First Round
|-
| style="text-align:left;"|Houston
| style="text-align:left;"|
|50||31	||19||.620|| style="text-align:center;"|3rd in Midwest||4||1||3||.250
| style="text-align:center;"|Lost in First Round
|-
| style="text-align:left;"|Houston
| style="text-align:left;"|
|82||34||48||.415|| style="text-align:center;"|6th in Midwest||—||—||—||—
| style="text-align:center;"|Missed Playoffs
|-
| style="text-align:left;"|Houston
| style="text-align:left;"|
|82||45||37||.549|| style="text-align:center;"|5th in Midwest||—||—||—||—
| style="text-align:center;"|Missed Playoffs
|-
| style="text-align:left;"|Houston
| style="text-align:left;"|
|82||28||54||.341|| style="text-align:center;"|5th in Midwest||—||—||—||—
| style="text-align:center;"|Missed Playoffs
|-
| style="text-align:left;"|Houston
| style="text-align:left;"|
|82||43||39||.524|| style="text-align:center;"|5th in Midwest||—||—||—||—
| style="text-align:center;"|Missed Playoffs
|-
| style="text-align:left;"|L.A. Lakers
| style="text-align:left;"|
|43||24||19||.558|| style="text-align:center;"|(resigned)||—||—||—||—
| style="text-align:center;"|—
|- class="sortbottom"
| style="text-align:left;"|Career
| ||943||527||416||.559|| ||90||51||39||.567

See also

 University of Michigan Athletic Hall of Honor

Footnotes

References
 Feinstein, John. The Punch: One Night, Two Lives, and the Fight That Changed Basketball Forever. Publisher: Back Bay Books.

External links

 University of Michigan profile

1948 births
Living people
All-American college men's basketball players
American autobiographers
American basketball scouts
American men's basketball coaches
American men's basketball players
American Olympic coaches
American people of Croatian descent
Basketball coaches from Michigan
Basketball players from Michigan
Houston Rockets assistant coaches
Houston Rockets head coaches
Houston Rockets players
Los Angeles Lakers head coaches
Los Angeles Lakers scouts
Michigan Wolverines men's basketball players
Naismith Memorial Basketball Hall of Fame inductees
National Basketball Association All-Stars
National Basketball Association championship-winning head coaches
National Basketball Association players with retired numbers
People from Hamtramck, Michigan
Power forwards (basketball)
San Diego Rockets draft picks
San Diego Rockets players
United States men's national basketball team coaches
Utah Stars draft picks
Violence in sports